Garden City, Kansas is a center of media in southwestern Kansas. The following is a list of media outlets based in the city.

Print
The Garden City Telegram is the city's daily newspaper with a circulation of nearly 8,000.

Radio
The following radio stations are licensed to and/or broadcast from Garden City:

AM

FM

Television
Garden City is in the Wichita-Hutchinson, Kansas television market. The following television stations are licensed to and/or broadcast from Garden City:

References

Garden
Mass media in Kansas